A centurion was a professional officer of the Roman army.

Centurion may also refer to:

Places
 Centurion, South Africa
 Centurion (Gautrain station)
 Centurion Bank, a submerged atoll southeast of Chagos Archipelago
 Centuriones, a historical name of El-Kentour, Algeria
 The Centurion, Bath, a public house

Arts, entertainment, and media

Film and television
 The Centurion (film), a 1961 historical drama film
 Centurions (TV series), a 1986 science fiction animated television series
 Centurion (film), a 2010 historical thriller directed by Neil Marshall

Games and toys
 Centurion: Defender of Rome, a computer game
 Centurion, a 2013 Nerf Blaster released under the N-Strike Elite Mega series

Literature
 Centurion (novel), a 2007 novel by Simon Scarrow
 Éditions du Centurion, a French publishing house
 The Centurions (Hunter novel), a 1981 American novel by Damion Hunter
 The Centurions  (Lartéguy novel), a 1960 French novel by Jean Lartéguy
 The Centurion, a 1989 novel by Jan de Hartog
 Centurion (magazine), a lifestyle magazine published by American Express
 The Centurion (magazine), a conservative magazine focused on Rutgers, the State University of New Jersey

Music
 The Centurians, an American surf rock band, aka Centurions

Military equipment
 Centurion (tank), a British battle tank
 HMS Centurion, the name of several ships and a shore base of the British Royal Navy
 Centurion C-RAM (counter rocket, artillery, and mortar), a land-based version of the naval Phalanx CIWS (close-in weapon system)

Plants
 Centurion, a California wine grape; see 
 Centurion (tree), the tallest eucalyptus in the world, 99.6 metres high

Sport
 Centurion (racewalking) a racewalking competition over 100 miles to be completed within 24 hours
 Centurion Park, a South African cricket ground
 A batter who has scored a hundred runs in a single inning of a cricket match
 Centurions, an expansion team of ACT Gridiron, Canberra, Australia
 Leigh Centurions, the former name of English rugby league club Leigh Leopards
 A disc golf fairway driver by Infinite Discs

Transportation
 NASA Centurion, aircraft
 Centurion (bicycle company), manufacturer in Japan
 Buick Centurion, car built by General Motors
 Centurion Air Cargo, an airline
 Thielert Centurion, German series of aircraft engines
 Cessna 210 Centurion, aircraft

People
 Iván Centurión, Argentine footballer 
 Hugo Pablo Centurión, Argentine footballer
 Germán Centurión, Paraguayan footballer
 Ezequiel Centurión, Argentine footballer 
 Ricardo Centurión, Argentine footballer 
 Diego Centurión, Paraguayan footballer
 Víctor Centurión, Paraguayan footballer
 El Centurión, stage name of wrestler Konnan
 Emanuel Centurión, Argentine footballer 
 Feliciano Centurión, Paraguayan visual artist
 Pablo Centurión, Paraguayan footballer
 Hugo Pablo Centurión, Argentine footballer
 Ramón Centurión, Argentine footballer
 Diego Centurión, Paraguayan footballer
 Paulo Centurión, Argentine footballer
 Juan José Gómez Centurión, Argentinian politician
 Guillermo Centurión, Uruguayan footballer
 Roque Centurión Miranda, Paraguayan playwright and theater director

Other uses
 Centurion (organization), U.S. non-profit organization
 Centurion Card, an American Express charge card
 Statgraphics Centurion XV, statistical software

See also
 
 
 Centurian (disambiguation)
 Centenarian a 100-year-old person
 Centurio (disambiguation)
 Century (disambiguation)